Gurahan-e Cham Shahivand (also Romanized as Gūrāhan-e Cham Shāhīvand; also known as Gorūhān-e Cham) is a village in Kashkan Rural District, Shahivand District, Dowreh County, Lorestan Province, Iran. At the 2006 census, its population was 35, in 7 families.

References 

Towns and villages in Dowreh County